Marlane Meyer is a television producer and writer. She is a recipient of the 1992-93 Susan Smith Blackburn Prize.

Filmography
Law & Order: Criminal Intent (as Marlane Gomard Meyer)
Paris enquêtes criminelles''' (as Marlane Gomard Meyer)CSI: Crime Scene InvestigationHyperion Bay
Now and Again
Sirens
Better Off Dead
Prison Stories: Women on the Inside
Nothing Sacred

PublicationsMoe's Lucky Seven in Plays From Playwrights Horizons'', Broadway Play Publishing Inc.

External links
 

Year of birth missing (living people)
Living people
American television producers
American women television producers
American television writers
Place of birth missing (living people)
American women television writers
American women screenwriters
21st-century American women